Pukkelpop 2010 ran from August 19 until August 21, 2010 in the Belgian village of Kiewit.

Line-up

Day 1: Thursday, August 19

Day 2: Friday, August 20

Day 3: Saturday, August 21

Pukkelpop
2010 in Belgium
2010 in music
2010 music festivals